This article gives a list of all British Rail Class 87 locomotives.

Pre-tops numbers E3201–34 were allocated to the first 34 locomotives, but these were never carried.

Notes

References

External links

 The AC Locomotive Group

Bo-Bo locomotives
BREL locomotives
British Rail electric locomotives
25 kV AC locomotives
British railway-related lists